Cori Schumacher is a world champion surfer, social justice advocate, scholar, and a former American politician.

Biography
Schumacher was born April 23, 1977, in Huntington Beach, California. Both her parents were avid surfers. The family  moved to San Diego where Schumacher learned the practice. Schumacher married her spouse, Maria De Jesus Cerda, in 2008. Schumacher is the first LGBTQ+ surfer to come out while a reigning world champion and is also the first LGBTQ+ member of the Carlsbad City Council.

Surfing
Schumacher has won multiple national and international surfing titles. She surfed as the #1 US female shortboarder on the 1994 and 1996 US Team for the ISA. Her most notable international shortboard title was the winner of the 1995 Pan-American Championships. But Schumacher is best known through her efforts in women's longboarding. She is a three-time Women's World Longboard Champion (2000, 2001, 2010), Women's Longboard Pipeline Pro Champion (2009) and two-time ASP North American Champion (2008, 2009). From late 2001 to 2008, Schumacher went on sabbatical from competition. She returned in 2008 to win the Linda Benson Roxy Jam at Cardiff, California. After winning her third world title in 2010, Schumacher took a stand against the first professional surfing championship to be hosted by China, writing in an email to ASP administrators, “I have deep political and personal reservations with being a part of any sort of benefit to a country that actively engages in human-rights violations, specifically those in violation of women.” Schumacher boycotted the world surfing tour and focused on founding social justice and diversity initiatives in surfing, including The Inspire Initiative (2012), The History of Women's Surfing (2012), and The Institute for Women Surfers (2014).

While still a world champion, Schumacher came out as gay. She was the first sitting world surfing champion to do so. “Part of my coming out process was finding worth in myself,” says Schumacher. “I didn't have that for a very long time, and I knew that other women on Tour were going through that as well. So while at some point in my life I wasn't willing to defend myself and have healthy boundaries for myself, I was able to get to a point where I was 100-percent committed to ensuring that I would do my best so that other young surfers, women and men alike, would not have to go through the type of pain that I went through.”

Activism
After boycotting the world surfing tour in 2011, Schumacher directed her focus to social justice work on gender equity and increasing LGBTQ+ and BIPOC representation in surfing. In 2013, she launched a viral online campaign demanding Roxy surf wear stop the sexualization of female professional surfers in their advertisements. The advertisement in question was made by Roxy as the main media for a world championship tour surfing contest in Biarritz, France—an event governed by the Association of Surfing Professionals, who up until the global push back had permitted contest sponsors to control media for professional surfing events. 2013 saw a shift in the ownership of the Association of Surfing Professionals organization, the governing body of the professional surfing tour since 1983. The current owners of the world professional surfing tour, the World Surf League (WSL), subsequently made increasing investments in women's surfing a priority and no longer allowed event sponsors to manage competition content.

In 2017, Schumacher published a chapter in the Critical Surf Studies Reader, a seminal anthology introducing the emerging academic field of critical surf studies. Her research focused on the gender pay gap, misogyny, and homophobia within the world of professional surfing. This work was an extension of the research she published regularly on her blog and in various periodicals, online news agencies, and in conference presentations since launching the Roxy viral campaign in 2013 and co-founding the Institute for Women Surfers with Professor Krista Comer of Rice University, in 2014.

In September 2018, the WSL announced they would be offering equal prize money to both male and female world championship tour athletes beginning in 2019.

In 2019, Schumacher worked with California Assemblymember Tasha Boerner-Horvath on Assembly Bill 467, California's "Equal Pay for Equal Play" legislation which emerged from conversations between the two. Schumacher testified in support of the bill and organized support for the legislation from professional surfers, skateboarders, and champion cyclists. The bill was signed by Governor Gavin Newsom in September 2019 and went into effect January 1, 2020.

Politics
From 2016 to 2021, Schumacher served as an elected official in Carlsbad, California.

In 2016, Schumacher was elected to the Carlsbad City Council as an at-large council member. She received support from the Carlsbad community after her work opposing a contentious mall development plan that the community ultimately rejected in a special election in February 2016. Schumacher was the first LGBTQ+ elected official in Carlsbad's history.

In 2018, Schumacher announced her campaign for Mayor of Carlsbad. However, she lost the election to incumbent mayor Matt Hall. As in 2016, her platform centered on creating a community choice energy program for Carlsbad. Carlsbad began working toward a tri-city community choice energy program in 2019. The Clean Energy Alliance was formed in 2019 and successfully launched in 2021. Schumacher was appointed as the Clean Energy Alliance's first board chairperson.

In 2020, Schumacher was elected to Carlsbad's District 1 seat directly before California went into lockdown due to the rapid spread of COVID-19. She became the target of increasingly hostile attacks after initiating a special meeting on January 5, 2021, to address Carlsbad's District 1 having become "ground zero" for restaurants defying California restrictions on indoor dining during the peak of COVID's impacts.

"In her time on City Council, Cori has centered transparency and government access, responsiveness to community needs and concerns, and principled policy stances. However, being a leader in this space has made her a target for misogynistic and homophobic attacks. In the intense climate of the last few months, the attacks on Cori have escalated, and she has received extra bigoted anonymous emails and harassment online and in public forums."

In 2021, Schumacher announced her resignation from the Carlsbad City Council to pursue her education, noting in her resignation letter that she would be attending "a university outside the county of San Diego." She is currently studying at the University of California, Berkeley.

References

External links
corischumacher.com
Waves of Disruption: The Cori Schumacher Story (Video)
Speaking Truth to Power (Podcast)

American surfers
Living people
1977 births
World Surf League surfers
Sportspeople from Huntington Beach, California
Sportspeople from San Diego
21st-century American politicians
21st-century American women politicians
American LGBT city council members
California city council members
Women city councillors in California
American LGBT sportspeople
Lesbian sportswomen
21st-century LGBT people
American female surfers